The War of the Two Peters was fought from 1356 to 1375 between the kingdoms of Castile and Aragon. Its name refers to the rulers of the countries, Peter of Castile and Peter IV of Aragon. One historian has written that "all of the centuries-old lessons of border fighting were used as two evenly matched opponents dueled across frontiers that could change hands with lightning speed."

Background

At the beginning of the fourteenth century, Castile was suffering from unrest caused by its civil war, which was fought between the local and allied forces of the reigning king, Peter of Castile, and his half-brother Henry of Trastámara over the right to the crown.

Peter IV of Aragon supported Henry of Trastámara. Henry was also supported by the French commander Bertrand du Guesclin and his "free companies" of troops. Peter of Castile was supported by the English. The War of the Two Peters can thus be considered an extension of the wider Hundred Years' War as well as the Castilian Civil War.

Peter of Castile sought to claim the Kingdom of Valencia, which included parts of Murcia, Elche, Alicante, and Orihuela. Peter of Aragon wished to dominate the Mediterranean in opposition to Castile and Castile's ally Genoa. 

A naval incident between the two powers had already caused tension: Catalan galleys, armed by Mossèn Francesc de Perellós, who had letters of marque from the Aragonese king, aided France against England, and also managed to capture two Genoese ships at Sanlúcar de Barrameda. Genoa was an ally of Castile. Peter of Castile, leading the Castilian fleet, caught up to Perellós at Tavira but was unable to capture him.

War

1356–1363
The war lasted from 1356 to 1375, prolonged because Peter of Castile lost his throne to Henry of Trastámara. The war primarily took place on the border between Castile and Aragon, namely Aragonese border towns such as Teruel, which fell to the Castilians.

In 1357, Castile penetrated Aragon and conquered Tarazona on March 9; on May 8, they arranged a temporary truce.

At the beginning of 1361, the Castilians conquered the fortresses of Verdejo, Torrijos, Alhama, and other places. However, the peace of Terrer (sometimes called the peace of Deza) was negotiated on May 18, 1361, in which all conquered places and castles were returned to their original lords. Bernardo de Cabrera, ambassador of the Aragonese king, negotiated the peace. Peter IV married his daughter Constance to Frederick III the Simple.

In June 1362, Peter of Castile met with Charles II of Navarre at Soria, and mutual aid was promised. Peter also contracted an alliance with Edward III of England and Edward's son The Black Prince.

With these negotiations complete, the Castilian king invaded Aragonese territory without officially declaring war, and the conflict commenced again.  The Aragonese king was at Perpignan without troops, and thus caught off guard.  The Castilians took the castles of Arize, Atece, Terrer, Moros, Cetina, and Alhama. Peter of Castile was unable to take Calatayud, even though he attacked it with all types of siege machines. Without taking his conquests any further, he returned to Seville.

In 1363 Castile continued the war against Aragon, and again occupied Tarazona. Peter of Castile received reinforcements from Portugal and Navarre. Meanwhile, the Aragonese king negotiated a treaty with France and a secret treaty with Henry II of Castile. Pedro of Castile then conquered Cariñena, Teruel, Segorbe, Morvedre, Almenara, Xiva, and Bunyol.

The papal nuncio Jean de la Grange arranged the peace of Morvedre (Sagunt) (July 2, 1363) between the two kings.  The peace was not ratified, however, and hostilities continued. The Castilians penetrated the Kingdom of Valencia in 1363, and conquered Alicante, Caudete, Elda, Gandia, and other places.

1363–1369
From 1365 to 1369 Peter of Castile was preoccupied with maintaining his position on the Castilian throne against Henry of Trastámara.

The Castilian Civil War began in 1366 and Peter of Castile was dethroned. He was assailed by his illegitimate brother Henry of Trastámara at the head of a host of soldiers of fortune, including Bertrand du Guesclin and Hugh Calveley. Peter abandoned the kingdom without daring to give battle, after retreating several times (first from Burgos, then from Toledo, and finally from Seville) in the face of the oncoming armies. Peter fled with his treasury to Portugal, where he was coldly received by his uncle, King Peter I of Portugal, and thence to Galicia, in northern Spain, where he ordered the murder of Suero, the archbishop of Santiago, and the dean, Perálvarez. Both the Archbishop and the Dean were supporters of Henry. 

Peter of Castile was overthrown in 1369. He was killed by Henry.

Invasion of Valencia
The Kingdom of Granada supported Peter of Castile in the War of the Two Peters.  Castilian troops and their Moorish allies invaded southern Valencia, which suffered low-level ravaging and political instability. The Castilians unsuccessfully laid siege to Orihuela in 1364.

End of the war

The war finally ended with the Peace of Almazán, in 1375, leaving no clear victor. Castile recovered comarcas that had passed under Aragonese rule, such as the lordship of Molina. A marriage was contracted between Eleanor of Aragon, daughter of Peter IV of Aragon, and John I of Castile, the successor of Henry II of Castile.

The misery of the war was compounded by the Black Death and other natural disasters, such as drought and a plague of locusts.  These events ruined the Aragonese economy, leading to a decrease of the country’s population.  The cathedral of Tarazona was destroyed during the war and not rebuilt until much later.

However, the war is believed to have led to the establishment of administrative and military forces that would ultimately result in a unified Castile and Aragon in the next century.

References

Bibliography

14th century in Aragon
Wars involving the Crown of Aragon
Wars involving Portugal
Wars involving the Kingdom of Castile
Conflicts of the Hundred Years' War
History of the Valencian Community
14th-century conflicts
14th century in Castile
Wars of succession involving the states and peoples of Europe